Poolewe is a small village in Wester Ross in the North West Highlands of Scotland, about  northwest of Inverness, by Loch Ewe. The village is surrounded by mountains and the sea.

The village has an indoor heated swimming pool, a coffee shop, a hotel and a shop. Most of the arts events in the area take place in the village hall, as do the village markets.

Origin of the name
Literally the name means "the pool on the Ewe river". However, William J. Watson, in his 1904 Place Names of Ross and Cromarty, states that the village was called by the natives in his time "Abhainn Iù, Ewe River". Watson also says that he had taken "Ewe" (Gaelic iu), with hesitation, to be from Irish eo, "yew tree", though concedes that it may be a Pictish name.

Climate
Poolewe has a mild climate for its latitude, due to the warm waters of the North Atlantic Drift. The Met Office operates a weather station at Poolewe for which 30-year averages are available. As with much of the British Isles and Scotland, Poolewe experiences a maritime climate with cool summers and mild winters, with snow lying only a few days per year. Its low-lying situation on the west coast tends to afford it some shelter from the harshness that can afflict the adjacent Highlands during the winter months.

The Northern Lights are visible on occasion, depending on the weather and time of year; most often in winter when skies are darkest.

Notable residents
In August 2015, the BBC genealogy documentary series Who Do You Think You Are? revealed that Donald Mackenzie, great-great-great-grandfather of celebrity chef Paul Hollywood, had been a crofter in Poolewe. Mackenzie lived into his eighties.

References

External links
Poolewe Tuesday Market

Populated places in Ross and Cromarty